Jamaican Patois (locally rendered Patwah and called Jamaican Creole by linguists) is an English-based creole language with West African influences, spoken primarily in Jamaica and among the Jamaican diaspora. A majority of the non-English words in Patois come from the West African Akan language. It is spoken by the majority of Jamaicans as a native language.

Patois developed in the 17th century when enslaved people from West and Central Africa were exposed to, learned, and nativized the vernacular and dialectal forms of English spoken by the slaveholders: British English, Scots, and Hiberno-English. Jamaican Creole exhibits a gradation between more conservative creole forms that are not significantly mutually intelligible with English, and forms virtually identical to Standard English.

Jamaicans refer to their language as Patois, a term also used as a lower-case noun as a catch-all description of pidgins, creoles, dialects, and vernaculars worldwide. Creoles, including Jamaican Patois, are often stigmatized as a low-prestige language even when spoken as the mother tongue by the majority of the local population. Jamaican pronunciation and vocabulary are significantly different from English despite heavy use of English words or derivatives.

Significant Jamaican Patois-speaking communities exist among Jamaican expatriates in South Florida, New York City, Toronto, Hartford, Washington, D.C., Nicaragua, Costa Rica, the Cayman Islands, and Panama, as well as London, Birmingham, Manchester, and Nottingham. The Cayman Islands in particular have a very large Jamaican Patois-speaking community, with 16.4% of the population conversing in the language. A mutually intelligible variety is found in San Andrés y Providencia Islands, Colombia, brought to the island by descendants of Jamaican Maroons (escaped slaves) in the 18th century. Mesolectal forms are similar to very basilectal Belizean Kriol.

Jamaican Patois exists mainly as a spoken language and is also heavily used for musical purposes, especially in reggae and dancehall as well as other genres. Although standard British English is used for most writing in Jamaica, Jamaican Patois has gained ground as a literary language for almost a hundred years. Claude McKay published his book of Jamaican poems Songs of Jamaica in 1912. Patois and English are frequently used for stylistic contrast (codeswitching) in new forms of Internet writing.

Phonology
Accounts of basilectal Jamaican Patois (that is, its most divergent rural varieties) suggest around 21 phonemic consonants with an additional phoneme in the Western dialect. There are between nine and sixteen vowels. Some vowels are capable of nasalization and others can be lengthened.

For the latter interpretation, their appearance is included in the larger phenomenon of phonetic palatalization.
Examples of palatalization include:
  →  →  ('a quarter quart (of rum)')
  →  →  ('guard')
  →  →  ('weak')

These two phenomena account for three long vowels and four diphthongs:

Sociolinguistic variation
Jamaican Patois features a creole continuum (or a linguistic continuum): the variety of the language closest to the lexifier language (the acrolect) cannot be distinguished systematically from intermediate varieties (collectively referred to as the mesolect) or even from the most divergent rural varieties (collectively referred to as the basilect). This situation came about with contact between speakers of a number of Niger–Congo languages and various dialects of English, the latter of which were all perceived as prestigious and the use of which carried socio-economic benefits.  The span of a speaker's command of the continuum generally corresponds to social context.

Grammar
The tense/aspect system of Jamaican Patois is fundamentally unlike that of English. There are no morphologically marked past participles; instead, two different participle words exist: en and a. These are not verbs, but rather invariant particles that cannot stand alone (like the English to be). Their function also differs from those of English.

Alleyne (1980) claims that  marks the progressive and that the habitual aspect is unmarked but by its accompaniment with words such as "always", "usually", etc. (i.e. is absent as a grammatical category).

 en is a tense indicator
 a is an aspect marker
 (a) go is used to indicate the future
 Mi run 
 I run (habitually); I ran 
 Mi a run or Mi de run,  ( or )
 I am running
 A run mi did a run, ( or )
 I was running
 Mi did run ( or )
 I have run; I had run
 Mi a go run
 I am going to run; I will go on a run

As in other Caribbean Creoles (that is, Guyanese Creole and San Andrés-Providencia Creole; Sranan Tongo is excluded)  has a number of functions, including:
 Directional, dative, or benefactive preposition
 Dem a fight fi wi ('They are fighting for us')
 Genitive preposition (that is, marker of possession)
 Dat a fi mi book ('that's my book')
 Modal auxiliary expressing obligation or futurity
 Him fi kom up ya  ('he ought to come up here')
 Pre-infinitive complementizer
 Unu haffi kiip sumting far di guinea people-dem fi biit dem muzik  ('you have to contribute something to the Guinean  People for playing their music')

Pronominal system

The pronominal system of Standard English has a four-way distinction of person, number, gender and case. Some varieties of Jamaican Patois do not have the gender or case distinction, but all varieties distinguish between the second person singular and plural (you).

 I, me = 
 you, you (singular) = 
 he, him =  (pronounced  in the basilect varieties)
 we, us, our = 
 you (plural) = 
 they, them, their =

Copula

 the Jamaican Patois equative verb is also a
 e.g.  ('I am the teacher')
 Jamaican Patois has a separate locative verb deh
 with true adjectives in Jamaican Patois, no copula is needed
 e.g.  ('I am old now')

This is akin to Spanish in that both have two distinct forms of the verb "to be" – ser and estar – in which ser is equative and estar is locative. Other languages, such as Portuguese and Italian, make a similar distinction. (See Romance Copula.)

Negation

  is used as a present tense negator:
  ('If the cow knew that his throat wasn't capable of swallowing a pear seed, he wouldn't have swallowed it')
  is used in the same way as English can't
  ('It is a poor thing that can't mash an ant')
  is a negative past participle.
  ('John did not steal the money')

Orthography

In 2002, the Jamaican Language Unit was set up at the University of the West Indies at Mona to begin standardizing the language, with the aim of supporting non-English-speaking Jamaicans according to their constitutional guarantees of equal rights, as services of the state are normally provided in English, which a significant portion of the population cannot speak fluently. The vast majority of such persons are speakers of Jamaican Patois. It was argued that failure to provide services of the state in a language in such general use or discriminatory treatment by officers of the state based on the inability of a citizen to use English violates the rights of citizens. The proposal was made that freedom from discrimination on the ground of language be inserted into the Charter of Rights. They standardized the Jamaican alphabet as follows:

Nasal vowels are written with -hn, as in kyaahn (can't) and iihn (isn't it?)

h is written according to local pronunciation, so that hen (hen) and en (end) are distinguished in writing for speakers of western Jamaican, but not for those of central Jamaican.

Vocabulary

Jamaican Patois contains many loanwords, most of which are African in origin, primarily from Twi (a dialect of Akan).

Many loanwords come from English, but are also borrowed from Spanish, Portuguese, Hindi, Arawak and African languages, as well as Scottish and Irish dialects.

Examples from African languages include  meaning that (in the sense of "he told me that..." = ), taken from Ashanti Twi, and Duppy meaning ghost, taken from the Twi word dupon ('cotton tree root'), because of the African belief of malicious spirits originating in the root of trees (in Jamaica and Ghana, particularly the cotton tree known in both places as "Odom"). The pronoun , used for the plural form of you, is taken from the Igbo language. Red eboe describes a fair-skinned black person because of the reported account of fair skin among the Igbo in the mid 1700s. De meaning to be (at a location) comes from  Yoruba. From the Ashanti-Akan, comes the term Obeah which means witchcraft, from the Ashanti Twi word Ɔbayi which also means "witchcraft".

Words from Hindi include ganja (marijuana). Pickney or pickiney meaning child, taken from an earlier form (piccaninny) was ultimately borrowed from the Portuguese pequenino (the diminutive of pequeno, small) or Spanish pequeño ('small').

There are many words referring to popular produce and food items—ackee, callaloo, guinep, bammy, roti, dal, kamranga. See Jamaican cuisine.

Jamaican Patois has its own rich variety of swearwords. One of the strongest is bloodclaat (along with related forms raasclaat, bomboclaat, pussyclaat and others—compare with bloody in Australian English and British English, which is also considered a profanity).

Homosexual men may be referred to with the pejorative term , fish  or battyboys.

Example phrases
 Mi almos lik 'im – I almost hit him
 'im kyaant biit mi, 'im jus lucky dat 'im won – He can't beat me, he just got lucky that he won.
 Seen  – Affirmative particle
  – Foolish exhibition, a person who makes a foolish exhibition of him or herself, or an exclamation of surprise.
  – Woman
  – Boy

Literature and film

A rich body of literature has developed in Jamaican Patois. Notable among early authors and works are Thomas MacDermot's All Jamaica Library and Claude McKay's Songs of Jamaica (1909), and, more recently, dub poets Linton Kwesi Johnson and Mikey Smith. Subsequently, the life-work of Louise Bennett or Miss Lou (1919–2006) is particularly notable for her use of the rich colorful patois, despite being shunned by traditional literary groups. "The Jamaican Poetry League excluded her from its meetings, and editors failed to include her in anthologies."  Nonetheless, she argued forcefully for the recognition of Jamaican as a full language, with the same pedigree as the dialect from which Standard English had sprung:

After the 1960s, the status of Jamaican Patois rose as a number of respected linguistic studies were published, by Frederic Cassidy (1961, 1967), Bailey (1966) and others. Subsequently, it has gradually become mainstream to codemix or write complete pieces in Jamaican Patois; proponents include Kamau Brathwaite, who also analyses the position of Creole poetry in his History of the Voice: The Development of Nation Language in Anglophone Caribbean Poetry (1984). However, Standard English remains the more prestigious literary medium in Jamaican literature. Canadian-Caribbean science-fiction novelist Nalo Hopkinson often writes in Trinidadian and sometimes Jamaican Patois. Jean D'Costa penned a series of popular children's novels, including Sprat Morrison (1972; 1990), Escape to Last Man Peak (1976), and Voice in the Wind (1978), which draw liberally from Jamaican Patois for dialogue, while presenting narrative prose in Standard English. Marlon James employs Patois in his novels including A Brief History of Seven Killings (2014). In his science fiction novel Kaya Abaniah and the Father of the Forest (2015), British-Trinidadian author Wayne Gerard Trotman presents dialogue in Trinidadian Creole, Jamaican Patois, and French while employing Standard English for narrative prose.

Jamaican Patois is also presented in some films and other media, for example, the character Tia Dalma's speech from Pirates of the Caribbean: Dead Man's Chest, and a few scenes in Meet Joe Black in which Brad Pitt's character converses with a Jamaican woman (Lois Kelly Miller). In addition, early Jamaican films like The Harder They Come (1972), Rockers (1978), and many of the films produced by Palm Pictures in the mid-1990s (e.g. Dancehall Queen and Third World Cop) have most of their dialogue in Jamaican Patois; some of these films have even been subtitled in English. It was also used in the second season of Marvel's Luke Cage but the accents were described as "awful" by Jamaican Americans.

Bible
In December 2011, it was reported that the Bible was being translated into Jamaican Patois. The Gospel of St Luke has already appeared as Jiizas: di Buk We Luuk Rait bout Im. While the Rev. Courtney Stewart, managing the translation as General Secretary of the West Indies Bible Society, believes this will help elevate the status of Jamaican Patois, others think that such a move would undermine efforts at promoting the use of English. The Patois New Testament was launched in Britain (where the Jamaican diaspora is significant) in October 2012 as "Di Jamiekan Nyuu Testiment", and with print and audio versions in Jamaica in December 2012.

A comparison of the Lord's Prayer

 ...as it occurs in Di Jamiekan Nyuu Testiment:

 Wi Faada we iina evn,
 mek piipl av nof rispek fi yu an yu niem.
 Mek di taim kom wen yu ruul iina evri wie.
 Mek we yu waahn apm pan ort apm,
 jos laik ou a wa yu waahn fi apm iina evn apm
 Tide gi wi di fuud we wi niid.
 Paadn wi fi aal a di rang we wi du,
 siem laik ou wi paadn dem we du wi rang.
 An no mek wi fies notn we wi kaaz wi fi sin,
 bot protek wi fram di wikid wan.

 ...as it occurs in English Standard Version:

 Our Father in heaven,
 hallowed be Your name.
 Your kingdom come,
 Your will be done,
 on earth, as it is in heaven.
 Give us this day our daily bread,
 and forgive us our debts,
 as we also have forgiven our debtors.
 And lead us not into temptation,
 but deliver us from evil.

The system of spelling used in Di Jamiekan Nyuu Testiment is the phonetic Cassidy Writing system adopted by the Jamaica Language Unit of the University of the West Indies, and while most Jamaicans use the informal "Miss Lou" writing system,  the Cassidy Writing system is an effort at standardizing Patois in its written form.

See also

 English-based creole languages
 Jamaican English
 Nation language
 Rastafarian vocabulary

Notes

References

Citations

General sources

Further reading

External links

 The Jamaican Language Unit 
 Jamaican Patois Dictionary
 Jamaican Creole Language Course for Peace Corps Volunteers
 Jammin Reggae Archives Patois Dictionary
 Sample Jamaican Patois Translations
 Jumieka Langwij

 
Jamaican culture
Analytic languages
English-based pidgins and creoles
Languages of Jamaica
Languages of the African diaspora
Articles containing video clips
Creoles of the Caribbean